Events from the year 2007 in Belarus

Incumbents
 President: Alexander Lukashenko
 Prime Minister: Sergei Sidorsky

Events

January

January 8: Russian oil supplies to Poland, Germany, and Ukraine are cut as the Russia-Belarus energy dispute escalates.
January 13: The energy dispute between Russia and Belarus is resolved after about 10 hours of negotiations between Russian Prime Minister Mikhail Fradkov and his Belarusian counterpart, Sergey Sidorsky.

March

March 25: Up to 10,000 people protest in Minsk against President of Belarus Alexander Lukashenko.

April

April 25: U.S. Deputy Assistant Secretary of State for European and Eurasian Affairs David Kramer, speaking on behalf of the U.S. government, offers to normalize relations with Belarus if it releases imprisoned politicians.

August

August 1: Russia's gas exports monopoly Gazprom will almost halve supplies to Belarus from August 3 after failing to reach a deal with Minsk over a $456 million energy debt.

Deaths

February 23: Hanna Barysevich, 118?, claimed to be world's oldest person.

See also
 Years in Belarus

References

 
Years of the 21st century in Belarus